Darkesville is an unincorporated community in Berkeley County, West Virginia, United States. Established in 1791, Darkesville has been nationally recognized as a historic district.

A post office and school (now closed) once operated in Darkesville.

Geography
Darkesville lies between Inwood and Martinsburg along U.S. Route 11.  The community's elevation is 531 feet (162 m), and it is located at about  (39.3738500, -78.0248602).

Middle Creek flows through the center of Darkesville.

Name
Established by an act of the Virginia General Assembly on December 7, 1791, on the property of James Buckells, Darkesville is named for William Darke, a Virginia military officer who had his headquarters in the community. Historically, Darkesville has been known by various names and a wide variety of spellings.  An 1895 atlas showed the community as "Buckletown", and later variants included "Buckellstown", "Buckels Town", "Buckelstown", "Buckle Town" and "Bucklestown", all referring to the entrepreneurial James Buckles (1732-1796) who contributed land and laid out the town in 1790. "James Town" and "Locke" have also been applied to the community. Its current name has also been spelled "Darkes" and "Darkville".

Historic district
In 1980, the community was listed on the National Register of Historic Places as a historic district. Darkesville was recognized for its historic architecture, which includes approximately twenty-five buildings constructed as log cabins in 1810 or earlier.

External sources 
"Darkesville: A Name Born of Tragedy," 8thVirginia.com (Gabriel Neville)

References

Populated places established in 1791
Unincorporated communities in Berkeley County, West Virginia
Unincorporated communities in West Virginia
National Register of Historic Places in Berkeley County, West Virginia
Federal architecture in West Virginia
Greek Revival architecture in West Virginia
Gothic Revival architecture in West Virginia
Historic districts in Berkeley County, West Virginia
Houses on the National Register of Historic Places in West Virginia
Houses in Berkeley County, West Virginia
Historic districts on the National Register of Historic Places in West Virginia